Hypena obsoleta is a moth of the family Erebidae. It was first described by Arthur Gardiner Butler in 1877. It is endemic to the Hawaiian islands of Kauai, Oahu, Molokai, Maui, Lanai and Hawaii.

It is one of the most variable of all Hawaiian insects. The color forms are most confusing, and it often appears that several species are represented in assembled series. The markings on some examples are extremely bold, but they are obsolete on other specimens, and all kinds of intergrades occur.

The larvae feed on Paspalum conjugatum and other grasses in the mountains

References

Endemic moths of Hawaii
obsoleta
Moths described in 1877